Jose Tamez is director of development for Salma Hayek's Ventanarosa Productions. For Disney’s ABC television network, he developed and is executive producing the English-language adaptation of the Colombian television telenovela Ugly Betty, starring America Ferrara. He is also producing (with Hayek, Rick Schwartz, and Edward Borges) La Banda, a Spanish-language romantic comedy,  starring Hayek, and written by Issa Lopez. For Viacom’s Showtime network, he produced the highly acclaimed The Maldonado Miracle, starring Salma Hayek. He also produced the television adaptation of Julia Alvarez’ novel, In the Time of the Butterflies, starring Salma Hayek. Previously, Tamez was a top executive at Televisa Editorial.

References

American television producers
Living people
Year of birth missing (living people)
Place of birth missing (living people)